The  is a professional golf tournament on the Japan Golf Tour. It is played in November at the Phoenix Country Club in Miyazaki, Miyazaki and is one of the richest tournaments in Japan, attracting some of the leading international golfers.

Course layout
From 2020 :

Previous tournaments:

Winners

Note: Green highlight indicates scoring records.

Notes

References

External links
Coverage on the Japan Golf Tour's official site
Official site 

Japan Golf Tour events
Golf tournaments in Japan
Sport in Miyazaki Prefecture
Mainichi Broadcasting System
Recurring sporting events established in 1972
1972 establishments in Japan